This is a list of Memphis Tigers men's basketball players who played in the National Basketball Association.

Current NBA Players
As of the 2022–23 NBA Season, seven former Tigers are currently signed to NBA rosters.

 Derrick Rose, New York Knicks (since 2021)
 Will Barton, Washington Wizards (since 2022)
 James Wiseman, Detroit Pistons (since 2023)
 Precious Achiuwa, Toronto Raptors (since 2021)
 Jalen Duren, Detroit Pistons (since 2022)
 Josh Minott, Minnesota Timberwolves (since 2022)
 Lester Quiñones, Golden State Warriors (since 2022)

All-time List of Memphis Tigers in the NBA & NBA Draft

Since the NBA Draft began in 1947, 52 players from Memphis have been drafted, and an additional nine played after being signed as undrafted free agents. Of the 52 drafted players, 28 played in at least one NBA (or ABA) game. Memphis has produced 14 first-round picks, including 8 top-ten picks and one number-one pick (Derrick Rose). Three former Tigers have been named NBA All-Stars: Larry Kenon (twice), Penny Hardaway (4 times), and Derrick Rose (3 times). Four have gone on to win the NBA Championship: Win Wilfong with the St. Louis Hawks in 1958, William Bedford with the Detroit Pistons in 1990, Earl Barron with the Miami Heat in 2006, and James Wiseman with the Golden State Warriors in 2022. 

In 2010, Memphis became the second college to produce two consecutive NBA Rookie of the Year winners: Derrick Rose in 2009 and Tyreke Evans in 2010 (the first being North Carolina with winners Walter Davis in 1978 and Phil Ford in 1979). In 2011, Rose became the first former Tiger to be named the NBA Most Valuable Player. 

Many Memphis players since the 1960s that have gone undrafted or had unsuccessful NBA careers have also played in professional leagues in Europe, Asia and/or Latin America. 

currently active players are in bold

  Player chose to play professionally in the American Basketball Association (ABA), which existed from 1967 to 1976.
  Rich Jones was originally drafted by the Phoenix Suns in 1968 in the fourth round as the 49th pick, but opted not to play. In 1969, he was drafted again by the Suns but chose instead to play in the ABA for the Dallas Chaparrals. He would eventually play in the NBA in 1976 when the New Jersey Nets joined as part of the NBA-ABA merger.
  Larry Kenon moved to the NBA after the San Antonio Spurs joined the NBA in 1976, as part of the NBA-ABA merger.
  Tarik Black transferred to Kansas for his senior season.  He played at Memphis from 2010 to 2013.
  Player was drafted but never played an NBA game.

Source:

References

National Basketball Association
Memphis Tigers men's basketball players
Memphis Tigers NBA